Øyvin Thon (born 25 March 1958) is a Norwegian orienteering competitor, and has seven gold medals at the World Orienteering Championships.

He is married to Brit Volden, also a World Orienteering Champion. In 2005 they both climbed Cho Oyu (8201 meters).

International championships
Thon won gold medals at the 1979 and 1981 Individual World Orienteering Championships, and finished second in 1983. He is also five times Relay champion, as a member of the Norwegian winning teams in 1981 (Thun, Switzerland), 1983 (Zalaegerszeg, Hungary), 1985 (Bendigo, Australia), 1987 (Gérardmer, France) and 1989 (Skaraborg, Sweden).

He won the Overall World Cup in Orienteering in 1988, and finished second in 1986.

National championships
Thon is several times Norwegian champion. He won the classic distance in 1980, achieved bronze medals in 1981 and 1982, and silver medal in 1985. He won the relay with the club IF Sturla seven years in a row from 1979 to 1985. He won the long distance in 1981, 1983 and 1986. He received gold medals in night orienteering in 1981, 1982 and 1984.

References

1958 births
Living people
Norwegian orienteers
Male orienteers
Foot orienteers
World Orienteering Championships medalists
Kongsberg IF
20th-century Norwegian people